BSFC may refer to:

 Barrow Sixth Form College
 Berkeley Student Food Collective
 Birkenhead Sixth Form College
 Blackpool Sixth Form College
 Bolton Sixth Form College
 Boston Society of Film Critics
 Brake-specific fuel consumption

It may also refer to one of the following association football clubs:
 Beaconsfield SYCOB F.C.
 Bethlehem Steel FC
 Billingham Synthonia F.C.
 Bishop's Stortford F.C.
 Bolehall Swifts F.C.
 Bly Spartans F.C.
 Blyth Spartans F.C.
 Brache Sparta F.C.
 Brereton Social F.C.
 Brett Sports F.C.
 Bromsgrove Sporting F.C.
 Budleigh Salterton F.C.
 Burton Swifts F.C.

See also 
 BSAFC
 BSFS (disambiguation)